Dorothy Bendross-Mindingall (born July 22, 1942, in Luverne, Alabama) is a former Democratic member of the Florida House of Representatives, representing the 109th district. She was elected to the House in 2000 and reelected in 2002, 2004, and 2006. Term limits forced her to leave the legislature in 2009; she was replaced by James Bush III. Dr. Bendross-Mindingall currently serves on the Miami-Dade county school board for district 2.

References

Living people
1942 births
People from Luverne, Alabama
Democratic Party members of the Florida House of Representatives
Women state legislators in Florida
School board members in Florida
21st-century American women